Matoaca High School is a secondary school in the Matoaca community of unincorporated Chesterfield County, United States. This is the newer campus of the school; the old school campus was converted into a middle school, known currently as Matoaca Middle School. The school's mascot is the Warrior. Matoaca is well known for its sports and its technology specialty center.

This school has a technology specialty program for students to learn about the computer industry, through teaching classes such as Oracle I and II, Cisco, and IT1 and 2 (preparatory classes for Network+ and A+ certifications). Matoaca was formally the only school in Chesterfield County that distributed laptop computers for their students' use, but due to "students [failing] to show any academic gains compared with those in schools without laptops" the school discontinued their use for those not in the Specialty Center program.

The school's only campus is located at 17700 Longhouse Lane in Chesterfield. However, the older school located at 6001 Hickory Road was converted into Matoaca Middle School's East Campus in approximately 2002, where the CBG (Center Based Gifted) program and 8th graders are housed. The school's East Campus covers over 100 acres.

Notable alumni

Terrell Brown – CBS News correspondent 
James Farrior – former Pittsburgh Steelers middle linebacker 
Javaid Siddiqi – Virginia Secretary of Education under Bob McDonnell
Sonya T. Smith – mechanical engineer at Howard University
Jennifer McClellan – Virginia state politician

References 

"Matoaca grad new envoy to Cape Verde" By Julian Walker.  Richmond Times-Dispatch.  September 28, 2005.
"The Great Divide:  Area schools cope with low budgets and high expectations" By Malcolm J. Venable. Richmond.com. May 9, 2000
"Former Chesterfield County Student - Athletes in 2005 NFL Pro Bowl".  Department of Public Affairs for Chesterfield County.  February 24, 2005

External links
 Matoaca High School Homepage

Public high schools in Virginia
Schools in Chesterfield County, Virginia
1963 establishments in Virginia